Sovetsky District is an administrative district (raion), one of the 10 raions of Novosibirsk, Russia. It is located on the right and left banks of the Ob River. The area of the district is 89,2 km2 (34,4 sq mi). Population: 141,911 (2018 Census).

History
The district was established on March 26, 1958. The new raion included Ogurtsovo, Left Chyomy and Right Chyomy, Nizhnyaya Yeltsovka, "Shcha" Microdistrict and Akademgorodok.

In 1959 more than 33,000 people lived in the Sovetsky District.

Akademgorodok
Akademgorodok was founded in 1957. Academicians Mikhail Lavrentyev,  Sergey Sobolev, Andrey Trofimuk, Sergey Khristianovich and others played a big role in establishing of the naukograd. The Institute of Hydrodynamics is one of the first research institutions that opened in the scientific town.

December 30, 2014 Akademgorodok was included in The Register of Objects of Cultural Heritage (monuments of history and culture) of the Peoples of the Russian Federation

Nizhnyaya Yeltsovka
The village has been known since the beginning of the 18th century.

ObGES Microdistrict

Shlyuz Microdistrict

Science

Scientific organizations in Akademgorodok

 Kutateladze Institute of Thermophysics
 Nikolaev Institute of Inorganic Chemistry
 Boreskov Institute of Catalysis
 Vorozhtsov Institute of Organic chemistry
 Budker Institute of Nuclear Physics
 Ershov Institute of Informatics Systems
 Institute of Informatics and Mathematical Geophysics
 Institute of Chemical Biology and Fundamental Medicine
 Institute of Cytology and Genetics
 Institute of Molecular and Cellular Biology
 Sobolev Institute of Mathematics
 United Institute of Geology, Geophysics and Mineralogy
 Institute of Automation and Electrometry
 Institute of Semiconductors Physics
 Khristianovich Institute of Theoretical and Applied Mechanics
 Voevodsky Institute of Chemical Kinetics and Combustion
 Lavrentyev Institute of Hydrodynamics
 Institute of History of Siberian Branch of the Russian Academy of Sciences
 Institute of Philology
 Institute of Philosophy and Law
 Institute of Laser Physics
 Institute of Solid State Chemistry and Mechanochemistry
 Research Institute of Circulation Pathology
 Institute of Economics and Industrial Engineering
 Trofimuk Institute of Petroleum Geology and Geophysics
 Presidium of the Siberian Division of the Russian Academy of Sciences
 Central Siberian Botanical Garden
 Institute of Computational Technologies

Scientific organizations in Nizhnyaya Yeltsovka
 Research Institute of Experimental and Clinical Medicine
 Research Institute of Molecular Biology and Biophysics
 Research Institute of Physiology and Fundamental Medicine
 Department of the Institute of Mining of the SB RAS

Scientific organizations in Shlyuz Microdistrict
 Research Institute of Automated Planning and Control Systems
 Department of Trofimuk Institute of Petroleum Geology and Geophysics

Education

Novosibirsk State University
Novosibirsk State University is located in the Akademgorodok. It was established in 1959.

Novosibirsk Lavrentyev Lyceum No. 130
Novosibirsk Lavrentyev Lyceum No. 130 is a school in Akademgorodok. It was founded in 1959.

Economy

Companies
 Alawar Entertainment
 Center of Financial Technologies
 Sibers

Culture

Museums
 Central Siberian Geological Museum
 Historical and Architectural Museum in the open air
 Museum of Archæology and Ethnography
 Novosibirsk Railway Museum

Houses of culture
 Akademia
 Houses of scientists
 Primorsky

Clubs
 Quant is a humorous club of the Department of Physics of the Novosibirsk State University, founded in 1968. It's part of the team of the KVN NSU.
 Pod integralom (Under the integral) is a Soviet discussion club, organized in the Academgorodok in the early 1960s.

Nature

Central Siberian Botanical Garden
Central Siberian Botanic Garden was founded in 1961.

By the Ob Sea Park
By the Ob Sea is a park in the ObGES Microdistrict.

Religion

Christianity

Buddhism

Rinchin Datsan in Nizhnyaya Yeltsovka

New religious movements
In 1989, the "Ashram Shambala" sect was created in the district. It consisted of approximately 20,000 followers.

Transportation

Railway
Four railway stations are located in the district: Nizhnyaya Yeltsovka, Seyatel, Obskoye More and Beregovaya.

References